Miles Thomas Motorsports is an American stock car racing team that currently competes in the 2022 NASCAR Xfinity Series and the 2022 ARCA Menards Series. Founded in 2021 by Mark Thomas and Jason Miles, they will field the No. TBA Ford Mustang part-time in the NASCAR Xfinity Series, and the No. 92 Ford Fusion part-time in the ARCA Menards Series, both being driven by owner/driver, Jason Miles.  Nothing has been heard from the team since then, and they ended up not running at all in 2022. It’s unknown whether they’ll attempt any races in 2023

History 
Miles Thomas Motorsports was formed in September 2021, by long time racing fan and enthusiast, Mark Thomas, and ARCA Menards Series driver, Jason Miles.

NASCAR Xfinity Series

Car No. TBA history 
The team was set to run a part-time schedule in the NASCAR Xfinity Series in 2022, for a TBA number, which was never announced. It would have been driven by the co-owner of the team, Jason Miles. They ended up not attempting any races in 2022.

ARCA Menards Series

Car No. 92 history 
The team had also planed to run part-time in the ARCA Menards Series in 2022, with the number 92. The car would have been driven by Jason Miles. They ended up not attempting any races in 2022.

References 
Stock car racing
American auto racing teams
NASCAR teams

External links 

Team Website